Belumosudil, sold under the brand name Rezurock among others, is a medication used for the treatment of chronic graft versus host disease (cGvHD). It is in the class of drugs known as  serine/threonine kinase inhibitors. Specifically, it is an inhibitor of Rho-associated coiled-coil kinase 2 (ROCK2; ROCK-II).  Belumosudil binds to and inhibits the  serine/threonine kinase activity of ROCK2. This inhibits ROCK2-mediated signaling pathways which play major roles in pro- and anti-inflammatory immune cell responses.  A genomic study in human primary cells demonstrated that the drug also has effects on oxidative phosphorylation, WNT signaling, angiogenesis, and KRAS signaling. 

The most common side effects include infections, asthenia, nausea, diarrhea, dyspnea, cough, edema, hemorrhage, abdominal pain, musculoskeletal pain, headache, phosphate decreased, gamma glutamyl transferase increased, lymphocytes decreased, and hypertension.

Belumosudil was approved for medical use in the United States in July 2021. The US Food and Drug Administration considers it to be a first-in-class medication.

Medical uses 
Belumosudil is indicated for the treatment of people aged 12 years and older with chronic graft-versus-host disease (chronic GVHD) after failure of at least two prior lines of systemic therapy.

History 
Originally developed by Surface Logix, Inc, belumosudil was later acquired by Kadmon Corporation. By July 2020, the drug completed Phase II clinical studies for cGvHD, IPF, and psoriasis.

cGvHD is a complication that can follow  allogeneic stem cell or hematopoietic stem cell transplantation  where the transplanted cells (graft) attack healthy cells (host). This causes inflammation and fibrosis in multiple tissues. Two cytokines controlled by the ROCK2 signaling pathway,  IL-17 and IL-21, have a major role in the cGvHD response.  In a 2016 report using both mouse models and a limited human clinical trial ROCK2 inhibition with belumosudil targeted both the immunologic and fibrotic components of cGvHD and reversed the symptoms of the disease. 

In October 2017, belumosudil was granted orphan drug status in the United States for treatment of patients with cGvHD.

Efficacy of belumosudil was evaluated in clinical trial NCT03640481, a randomized, open-label, multicenter dose-ranging trial that included 65 patients with chronic GVHD who were treated with belumosudil 200 mg taken orally once daily.

On 16 July 2021, the US Food and Drug Administration (FDA) approved belumosudil for people 12 years and older with chronic graft-versus-host disease (chronic GVHD) after failure of at least two prior lines of systemic therapy.

Research 
IPF is a progressive fibrotic disease where the lining of the lungs become thickened and scarred. Increased ROCK activity has been found in the lungs of humans and animals with IPF.  Treatment with belumosudil reduced lung fibrosis in a bleomycin mouse model study.

Psoriasis is an inflammatory skin condition where patients experiences eruptions and remissions of thickened, erythematous, and scaly patches of skin. Down-regulation of pro-inflammatory responses was observed with KD025 treatment in Phase 2 clinical studies in patients with moderate to severe psoriasis.

References

External links 
 

Breakthrough therapy
Indazoles
Nanomaterials
Orphan drugs
Protein kinase inhibitors
Quinazolines